Yamanya Stadium is a multi-purpose stadium, located in downtown Mawlamyine, Myanmar.

Yamanya Stadium also hosts other local and regional football tournaments. Now, this stadium is under construction. Southern Myanmar F.C is based in this stadium in for Myanmar National League.

References

Football venues in Myanmar
Mawlamyine
Multi-purpose stadiums in Myanmar